Hegy Propellers, founded by Ray Hegy, was an American manufacturer of wooden propellers for homebuilt and ultralight aircraft. The company headquarters was located in Marfa, Texas.

Propellers were made from birch and maple.

History 
Ray Hegy worked in Milwaukee, building propellers for iceboats. This experience qualified him to respond to an ad "for cabinetmakers to build wooden craft propellers" in 1925. Ray Hegy bought his first plane, a Waco-10, in 1928. In 1957, Hegy started building the Chuparosa and was finished after nine years at a cost of $600. The success of the Chuparosa changed Hegy "from a furniture maker and refinisher to a full-time carver of wooden propellers." At that time, Hegy made his propellers in his backyard workshop.

See also
List of aircraft propeller manufacturers

References 

Aircraft propeller manufacturers
Aerospace companies of the United States